Wilhelm Lenz (February 8, 1888 in Frankfurt am Main – April 30, 1957 in Hamburg) was a German physicist, most notable for his invention of the Ising model and for his application of the Laplace–Runge–Lenz vector to the old quantum mechanical treatment of  hydrogen-like atoms.

Biography
In 1906, Lenz graduated from the Klinger-Oberralschule, a non-classical secondary school in Frankfurt, and went to study mathematics and physics at the University of Göttingen.  From 1908 to 1911, Lenz studied under Arnold Sommerfeld, at the University of Munich, and he was granted his doctorate on March 2, 1911.  Upon graduation, he stayed on at the University, became Sommerfeld’s assistant on April 1, 1911, and he completed his Habilitation on February 20, 1914, becoming a Privatdozent on April 4, 1914.  During World War I, he served as a radio operator in France and was awarded the Iron Cross Second Class in 1916.  From September 30, 1920, he was again an assistant to Sommerfeld at the University of Munich’s Institute of Theoretical Physics, and he was appointed to the title and rank of extraordinarius professor at the University, on November 11, 1920.  On December 1, 1920 he became an extraordinarius professor at the University of Rostock. From 1921, until his retirement in 1956, he was at the University of Hamburg, as Ordinarius Professor of Theoretical Physics and Director of the Institute of Theoretical Physics.

The formation of the new chair and institute for theoretical physics at Hamburg was a result of advances being made in Germany on atomic physics and quantum mechanics and the personal intervention of Sommerfeld, who helped many of his students get such professorships.

At Hamburg, Lenz trained Ernst Ising and J. Hans D. Jensen; his assistants there included Wolfgang Pauli Pascual Jordan, and Albrecht Unsöld.  Together with Pauli and Otto Stern, Lenz built up the Institute into an international center for nuclear physics.  They maintained close scientific and personal exchanges with the institutes for theoretical physics at the Universities in Munich (Sommerfeld), Göttingen (Max Born), and Copenhagen (Niels Bohr).

When Lenz retired in 1956 he was succeeded by Harry Lehmann.

Books
Wilhelm Lenz Einführungsmathematik für Physiker (Verlagsanstalt Wolfenbüttel, 1947)

Notes

References
Mehra, Jagdish, and Helmut Rechenberg The Historical Development of Quantum Theory. Volume 1 Part 1 The Quantum Theory of Planck, Einstein, Bohr and Sommerfeld 1900 – 1925: Its Foundation and the Rise of Its Difficulties. (Springer, 2001) 
Mehra, Jagdish, and Helmut Rechenberg The Historical Development of Quantum Theory. Volume 1 Part 2 The Quantum Theory of Planck, Einstein, Bohr and Sommerfeld 1900 – 1925: Its Foundation and the Rise of Its Difficulties. (Springer, 2001) 
Mehra, Jagdish, and Helmut Rechenberg The Historical Development of Quantum Theory. Volume 5 Erwin Schrödinger and the Rise of Wave Mechanics. Part 1 Schrödinger in Vienna and Zurich 1887–1925. (Springer, 2001) 

Scientists from Frankfurt
20th-century German physicists
1888 births
1957 deaths
Academic staff of the University of Hamburg
Academic staff of the University of Rostock
University of Göttingen alumni
Ludwig Maximilian University of Munich alumni